Dolno Sedlarce is a village in the municipality of Brvenica, North Macedonia.

Demographics
As of the 2021 census, Dolno Sedlarce had 805 residents with the following ethnic composition:
Macedonians 778
Persons for whom data are taken from administrative sources 19
Others 8

According to the 2002 census, the village had a total of 693 inhabitants. Ethnic groups in the village include:

Macedonians 690
Serbs 3

References

Villages in Brvenica Municipality